WRVQ (94.5 FM "Q94") is a commercial radio station licensed to Richmond, Virginia, and serving Central Virginia.  WRVQ is owned and operated by Audacy, Inc. It airs a Top 40 (CHR) radio format.  The syndicated Elvis Duran show from former sister station WHTZ in New York City is heard in morning drive time.  The studios and offices are located just north of Richmond city limits on Basie Road in unincorporated Henrico County, Virginia.

WRVQ's transmitter is on WRVA Road in Henrico, co-located with the towers for sister station WRVA 1140 AM.  WRVQ has an unusually high effective radiated power (ERP) of 200,000 watts.  It broadcasts in the HD Radio hybrid format.  The HD2 digital subchannel carries the sports radio programming of sister station WRNL 910 AM.

History

Early years as WRVB, WRVA-FM
On August 10, 1948, the station signed on as WRVB. It was the FM counterpart to WRVA.  WRVA and WRVB were owned by a tobacco company, Larus & Brother, with studios in the Hotel Richmond.  WRVB had an effective radiated power of 25,000 watts, mostly simulcasting WRVA, including the line-up of CBS Radio Network dramas, comedies, sports and news, during the "Golden Age of Radio."

In 1956, Larus & Brother signed on WRVA-TV (now WWBT).  At the same time, the FM call sign was switched to WRVA-FM.  When the TV station became an NBC network affiliate, WRVA-AM-FM switched to the NBC Radio Network as well.

Superpower authorization
In the 1960s, WRVA-FM was one of several Richmond FM stations receiving permission from the Federal Communications Commission for unusually high power. Today, Richmond is in Zone 1, limited to a maximum of 50,000 watts effective radiated power (ERP). Before these rules were strictly enforced, WFMV (now WURV) was permitted to operate at 74,000 watts, WRNL-FM (now WRXL) broadcast at 120,000 watts, and, to this day, 94.5 is grandfathered at 200,000 watts. Over time, those stations reduced their power but kept their coverage area by locating on taller towers.

In the 1960s, WRVA-FM began to broadcast its own programming, mostly easy listening music, with the AM station's news and other shows simulcast during some hours.

Top 40 WRVQ
In 1969, WRVA-AM-FM were sold to Southern Broadcasters.  In 1972, Southern Broadcasters switched WRVA-FM to a new Top 40 format as WRVQ.  Until the 1970s, Top 40 stations were mostly on the AM band.  In Richmond, the big contemporary stations were WTVR (now WBTK) and WLEE (now WTOX).  Most home and car radios could only receive AM broadcasts at this time.

At first, WRVQ operated as an automated station, but by the late 1970s, live DJs were added.  In 1978, Southern Broadcasters became Harte-Hanks Radio.  In 1984, WRVA and WRVQ were sold to Edens Broadcasting,  and were in turn sold to Clear Channel Communications (now iHeartMedia) in 1992. Through all the sales, WRVQ has stayed in the same format, as the leading Top 40 station in the Richmond radio market.

Entercom ownership
On November 1, 2017, iHeartMedia announced that it would swap its stations in Richmond and Chattanooga to Entercom, in exchange for stations in Boston and Seattle being divested by Entercom to comply with FCC ownership caps during its merger with CBS Radio.  In March 2021, Entercom changed its name to Audacy, Inc.

WRVQ HD-2
WRVQ broadcasts in the HD Radio format.  WRVQ-HD2 formerly carried "The Planet", an automated classic rock format. On January 1, 2018, WRVQ-HD2 and FM translator W241AP 96.1 MHz, were converted to an FM simulcast of WRVA, returning the station to the same programming as its original AM sister station for the first time in decades.

The HD2 subchannel later changed to a simulcast of co-owned sports radio station WRNL 910 AM.  WRVA is now heard on the HD2 subchannel of co-owned 98.1 WTVR-FM, which in turn feeds the W241AP translator.

References

External links

RVQ
Contemporary hit radio stations in the United States
Radio stations established in 1948
Audacy, Inc. radio stations